Colonel (Rtd.) Mohamed Nazim (MSc, psc) is the former Minister of Defence and National Security of the Republic of Maldives. He first became the Defence Minister on 8 February 2012 under the presidency of Dr. Mohamed Waheed Hassan Manik.He  last served as  the Administrative Officer of the Integrated Headquarters of Maldives National Defence Force. He retired from active service on 15 January 2011.

Biography
Born in Male’, Maldives, Minister graduated from Majeediya School prior to his enlistment on 11 March 1987. Upon graduation, Mohamed Nazim was called in by the government to put his compulsory service to the nation as a soldier. Unlike most of his friends who sought several excuses to evade compulsory  military service, he chose to embrace the strenuous life. He is fondly named as Seeney by his friends. Seeny somewhat reflects that name of his house M. Seenu Karankaage, Male'.

The knowledge and experience acquired from the Training Centre that with his charismatic leadership  garnered  him the trust from the helm of the organization, endorsing him to many prestigious appointments in his 23 years of dedicated service. He commanded the Quick Reaction Force 2 now inducted to the Marine Corps and the Regional Headquarters Seenu Gan now inducted to the Southern Area Command. He was also the Commanding Officer of the Maldives National Cadet Corps and  the President  of the  Dhivehi Sifainge Club. He held the post of Deputy Commanding Officer of Maldives National Cadet Corps for 6 consecutive years.

In his secondary area of expertise, disaster management, he has attended many courses and seminars and has acquired extensive knowledge and experience in the field, having formulated many contingency plans for disaster mitigation, relief and evacuation drills. He is also involved in his family business, Rasheed Carpentry, which is a construction company. He also runs H78, a small boutique hotel in the island of Hulhumale'.

Military Career and Training
He completed all the local military trainings that a soldier would undergo in the Maldives before undergoing the advance trainings in  School of Infantry and Tactic, Quetta, Pakistan and in Infantry School, Fort Benning, Georgia, USA. Minister Nazim is also a graduate of the Mubarak Al Abdullah Command and Staff College, Kuwait, earning excellence in the Master of Military Science Degree program.

He also completed the United Nations Military Observer Course at Malaysian Peacekeeping Training Centre, Malaysia, International Disaster Management Course at Bournemouth University, UK, and Regional Disaster Management Course at Asian Disaster Preparedness Center, Bangkok, Thailand.

Apart from attending to several workshops, seminars and conferences he is an alumna of Asia Pacific Centre for Security Studies, College of Security Studies, USA and Near East South Asia Center for Strategic Studies, National Defense University, USA. He is also a member of Association of the United States Army, USA.

Disaster Management Center
Minister Nazim played a vital role in the formulation of National Disaster Management Plan and Act, establishing and organizing the newly enacted Disaster Management Centre in the wake of India Ocean Tsunami 2004, coordination and execution of bilateral trainings, organizing various types of conferences and national  ceremonies, organizing and executing of HOD protection, formulating the MNDF Drill Manual, and formulating various training syllabuses including the MNCC Training Syllabus, are only a few to mention.

Family 
Col ( rtd) Mohamed Nazim is married to Afaaf Abdul Majeed. He has two daughters, Aiminath Vulau and a son, Ahmed Looth.

Dismissal
"Maldivian President Abdulla Yameen has today (19th January 2015) dismissed … Col Mohamed Nazim from the post of Minister of Defense and National Security," the president's office noted in a statement released on Tuesday. The statement announced a successor for the defense minister position; retired army general, Moosa Ali Jaleel, will take over the position.

According to Defense News, "police were seen taking away unspecified documents during a raid early on Sunday" at the defense minister's home. Reportedly, the raid was initiated on suspicions that the defense minister was "harboring weapons and explosives." The minister's sacking could have been related to political infighting, though this remains ambiguous. Nazim did play a major role in ousting of the small island state's first democratically elected leader, Mohamed Nasheed, in 2012. Nasheed stepped down as president after widespread protests by the opposition in which some units of the military and police force (special operations) backed the opposition demonstrators & mutinied . 
Nasheed claimed that he'd been ousted in a coup d’état.

Mohamed Nazim, was later appointed as Minister of Defense by the Vice President of Nasheed's Government who succeeded him to Presidency.
He commanded the defense force's with an iron fist. Many soldiers, including 2 brigadier generals, a colonel and many other non commissioned officers were dismissed from the military service without due trails, after they brought up concern's over mishandling of security forces during the coup d'état and after.

He was best known for his role during the Male' water crisis. However, with the way how events unfolded, there were allegations that the crisis was engineered to gain popularity that is much needed to further his political ambitions.

After his own dismissal, former Defense Minister Nazim, who spoke with the press, noted that the police raid against his home was entirely inappropriate and unwarranted. "In which country of the world do police kick down the door to a defense minister’s home and proceed to destroy all doors and conduct a raid at 3:30 am while the defense minister is asleep," noted Nazim, as quoted by a local news agency. He vowed to remain involved in politics & that he would make the government accountable.

Maldivian police noted that "lethal weapons" had been confiscated from the defense minister's home and that Nazim had refused to cooperate with their investigation.

Under Maldivian law, it is illegal to possess any weapon.

However, Mr Nazim was one of the convicts to be released under the Maldives Supreme Court Order issued on 1 February 2018.

After President Ibrahim Mohamed was elected as the new President of Maldives in September 2018, the courts in Maldives have reviewed and reversed some of their own verdicts. Hence, Col.rtd. Nazim has now been released from jail and the execution of the previous verdict against him is suspended for the time being. In the meantime, he has joined the Republican Party run by business tycoon Buruma Gasim Ibrahim, who was also the then Speaker of the Maldivian Parliament. Currently, Mr Nazim is an elected member of the Parliament representing Dhangenthi constituency.

After his release from prison, Col. Rtd. Nazim said that, the former President of Maldives Mr Yamin Abdul Gayoom and the former Commissioner of Police Mr Hussein Waheed were involved in framing him and putting him behind bars. He vowed to bring both of them before the court.

References

presidencymaldives.gov.mv

Maldivian military personnel
Living people
People from Malé
Government ministers of the Maldives
Year of birth missing (living people)